The Early Basketmaker II Era (1500 BCE – 50 CE) was the first Post-Archaic cultural period of Ancient Pueblo People. The era began with the cultivation of maize in the northern American southwest, although there was not a dependence upon agriculture until about 500 BCE. It is preceded by the Archaic-Early Basketmaker Era, and is followed by the Late Basketmaker II Era.

Basketmaker origin
The population of the Basketmaker people is likely not tied to one particular group of people, but reflective of the migration of agricultural people from the south and adoption of agriculture by local Archaic populations. For instance people on the Mogollon Rim of New Mexico had cultivated maize and adopted a less transitory lifestyle before the Early Basketmakers.

Projectile points, a basketry style known as "two rod and bundle", and other similarities existed between the Basketmakers II and the people of the San Pedro stage of the Cochise tradition.

To adopt the Basketmaker lifestyle, Archaic people would have adopted the cultivation of maize, a less mobile lifestyle and taken up residence in pit-houses. Other differences between the Archaic and Basketmaker cultures were the forms of basketry, symbols used in petroglyphs, burial practices and increase in traded items.

Culture
The Early Basketmakers were primarily nomadic hunter gatherers for most of this period. They roamed the Colorado Plateau in small bands to collected ripe wild plants and hunted game. Roaming also put them in contact with other tribes with whom they socialized, traded, and sometimes inter-married. Cultivation of maize began about 500 BCE, which affected their mobility.

Shelter
Dwellings of this period included caves and other shelters, often built below ground and lined with stone.

Agriculture
Maize and squash were first cultivated more than 8,700 years ago in southwestern Mexico. Between 1000 and 2000 BCE maize and squash were found on the Colorado Plateau of the present United States. By 500 BCE maize was routinely cultivated and a major source of food in the Basketmakers' diet. Cultivating maize allowed the Basketmakers control over their food supply; They cultivated what they needed and stored surplus ground corn for later consumption. At first maize did not significantly modify their nomadic lifestyle. After the early Basketmakers planted the seed, they continued roaming for game and other wild foods. Just as they followed the seasonal growing cycles for wild plants, like pinyon nuts, they returned to harvest their crops when it was ripe for picking.

While they lived their nomadic lifestyle, though, the unattended crops were eaten by deer, birds, and rodents. This required the Basketmakers to stay by their crop and protect it until it was ready to be harvested. Once harvested, they created storage pits to protect the seeds for the following year's crops and surplus food from being eaten by insects and rodents. The pits were lined and covered with slabs of stone and bark and tightly sealed with adobe.

Sites
The earliest pit-house dwelling (405–75 BCE) in southwestern Colorado is located on Sleeping Ute Mountain on the Ute Mountain Ute Tribe reservation (site 5MT10525). It had a hearth for cold weather, yet there was no evidence found of food cultivation. En Medio projectile points on the site that were of the Oshara tradition of the Archaic Southwest. Because it was a permanent or semi-permanent structure, the site may represent a precursor to the farming activities of the Early Basketmaker II.

Basketry
The basket is made with bundles of thin, pliable twigs and yucca fibers. The bundles were coiled into a spiral pattern and sewn in place with strips of yucca leaves about 3 mm wide. Baskets were used to gather, store and cook food. The basket was made during the period when people were still semi-nomadic.

Material goods
The Early Basketmakers' personal belongings included:
 weapons
 clothing
 baskets

Cultural groups and periods
The cultural groups of this period include:
 Ancestral Puebloans – southern Utah, southern Colorado, northern Arizona and northern and central New Mexico
 Hohokam – southern Arizona
 Mogollon – southeastern Arizona, southern New Mexico and northern Mexico
 Patayan – western Arizona, California and Baja California

Notable Early Basketmaker II sites
 Petrified Forest National Park – Arizona
 Sleeping Ute Mountain – Colorado
 Virgin Anasazi – Colorado Plateau of Nevada, Utah and Arizona
 Zion National Park – Utah

References

Further reading
 Reed, Paul F. (2000) Foundations of Anasazi Culture: The Basketmaker Pueblo Transition. University of Utah Press. .
 Stuart, David E.; Moczygemba-McKinsey, Susan B. (2000) Anasazi America: Seventeen Centuries on the Road from Center Place. University of New Mexico Press. .
 Wenger, Gilbert R. The Story of Mesa Verde National Park. Mesa Verde Museum Association, Mesa Verde National Park, Colorado, 1991 [1st edition 1980].  .

Native American history of Arizona
Native American history of Colorado
Native American history of Nevada
Native American history of New Mexico
Native American history of Utah
Oasisamerica cultures
Pueblo history
Southwest periods in North America by Pecos classification